Ron Cihuatán is a brand of rum from El Salvador.

History
Licorera Cihuatán S.A. DE C.V., distiller of Cihuatán Rum, was founded in 2004, and is a division of Ingenio La Cabaña, a long established sugar producer. The distillery is located in El Paisnal municipality, El Salvador, and takes its name from a Mayan settlement, now the Cihuatán archaeological site. The company applied for a US trademark in 2014, which was granted in 2016. The first release was an 8 year old rum in 2015, coinciding with their first exports to markets including Lithuania. In 2020 Cihuatán Indigo 8 Years Old Rum won Double Gold in The Fifty Best competition, and also in 2020 the company won Double Gold at the International Spirits Challenge for their rebranding of the Indigo and Cinabrio expressions.

Production
Cihuatán Rum is produced from sugarcane grown in El Salvador and initially processed by parent company Ingenio La Cabaña. The Cihuatán team work with their parent company to select molasses for fermentation and distillation. Cihuatán is distilled in a continuous process using column stills. The rum is matured predominately in former bourbon barrels for at least eight years.

Products

 Cihuatán Indigo - matured for 8 years in former bourbon barrels
 Cihuatán Cinabrio - matured for 12 years in former bourbon barrels
 Cihuatán Sahumerio - blend of rums matured for between 12 and 14 years
 Cihuatán Xaman XO - initially matured for 15 years in former bourbon barrels, before finishing for one year in Mayan Ceiba barrels.

References

External links 
 Cihuatán Rum website
 Ingenio La Cabaña website

Alcoholic drink brands
Distilled drinks
Distilleries
Rums